The 2016–17 Isle of Man League was the 108th season of the Isle of Man Football League on the Isle of Man. It began on August 13, 2016 and ended on May 17, 2017. St Georges was the defending champion.

Promotion and relegation following the 2015–16 season

From the Premier League 
 Relegated to Division 2
 Marown
 Ramsey YCOB

From Division Two 
 Promoted to the Premier League
 Douglas Athletic
 Colby

League table

Premier League

References

Isle of Man Football League seasons
Man
Foot
Foot